Gnorimoschema huffmanellum is a moth in the family Gelechiidae. It was described by Metzler and Adamski in 2002. It is found in North America, where it has been recorded from Ohio.

References

Gnorimoschema
Moths described in 2002